The Rømer scale (notated as °Rø), also known as Romer or Roemer, is a temperature scale named after the Danish astronomer Ole Christensen Rømer, who proposed it in 1701. It is based on the freezing point of pure water being 7.5 degrees and the boiling point of water as 60 degrees.

Degree measurements 
In this scale, the zero was initially set using freezing brine. The boiling point of water was defined as 60 degrees. Rømer then saw that the freezing point of pure water was roughly one eighth of the way (about 7.5 degrees) between these two points, so he redefined the lower fixed point to be the freezing point of water at precisely 7.5 degrees. This did not greatly change the scale but made it easier to calibrate by defining it by reference to pure water. Thus the unit of this scale, a Rømer degree, is 100/52.5 = 40/21 of a kelvin or Celsius degree. The symbol is sometimes given as °R, but since that is also sometimes used for the Réaumur and Rankine scales, the other symbol °Rø is to be preferred.

Importance 
The Rømer scale is no longer in use, but it is of some historical importance.  Alongside the Newton scale, it was the first calibrated scale.  Previous thermometers gave only an indication of whether the temperature was rising or falling, or else were highly inaccurate.  For instance the top and bottom marks of thermometers were typically set to the hottest and coldest days, respectively, of the current year which clearly would vary from year to year.  The idea of using two fiduciary points with equally spaced calibration marks between them was completely new.

Rømer was familiar with Galileo's thermoscope and understood that its large inaccuracies were due to it being affected by air pressure as well as temperature.  He followed Ferdinand II of Tuscany's idea of enclosing a liquid in a sealed glass tube which made it immune to pressure changes.  Rømer's thermometer was also an improvement in the fluid that he used.
He used a mixture of alcohol and water, conveniently available in the form of wine.  This avoided the drawbacks of both the low boiling point of pure alcohol and the extreme non-linearity of pure water near freezing.

Relationship to other scales 

Daniel Gabriel Fahrenheit, inventor of the Fahrenheit scale,  learned of Rømer's work and visited him in 1708. Fahrenheit described how he borrowed the idea for his scale from this visit, but increased the number of divisions.

Newton published his scale in the same year as Rømer. Newton's system was calibrated between the freezing point of water (0 degrees) and human body temperature (12 degrees); it was a coarser scale, but unlike Rømer's it was not intended for everyday use, as Newton's interest was in determining the melting points of metals, which are not readily accessible with Rømer's system based on liquid thermometers.

See also 
 Comparison of temperature scales

Notes and references

Obsolete units of measurement
Scales of temperature
Danish inventions